Parliamentary elections were held in Brazil on 15 November 1982. The Democratic Social Party (the successor of the ruling National Renewal Alliance) won 235 of the 479 seats in the Chamber of Deputies and 15 of the 25 seats in the Senate. Voter turnout was 82.8%.

Electoral system
Due to the growing popularity of the opposition Brazilian Democratic Movement, the ruling National Renewal Alliance Party passed electoral reforms in 1979, replacing the two-party system in place since 1965 with a multi-party system.

Results

Chamber of Deputies

Senate

References

General elections in Brazil
Brazil
Legislative
Brazil